Trypoxylon lactitarse is a species of square-headed wasp in the family Crabronidae. It is found in Central America, North America, and South America. These are fairly common harmless black wasps that build muddy elongate nests on the external walls of houses and low-story apartments. Their characteristic nests resemble pan-flutes in shape, and are provisioned with spiders captured and paralysed by the mother wasp. It lays an egg within each elongate nest cell amongst the invalid spiders, from which a larva will hatch and slowly consume all spiders as food. This species apparently undergoes four larval moults  until completing their development as pupae inside a black cocoon.

References

Crabronidae
Articles created by Qbugbot
Insects described in 1867